Minestra di ceci (chickpea soup) is a soup in Italian cuisine prepared with chickpeas as a primary ingredient. Dried chickpeas that have been soaked or canned chickpeas may be used. Additional ingredients can vary, and may include foods such as salt cod, chestnuts, artichoke, potato, tomato, pasta, and cabbage, among others. Soup base ingredients may include olive oil, garlic, onion, carrot, and celery, among others.

History
Minestra di ceci is a common soup in the Abruzzo regione of Italy, and has been described as a winter soup.

See also
 List of Italian soups

References

Further reading

External links
 Minestra di ceci. Le Journal de Montréal.

Cuisine of Abruzzo
Italian soups
Chickpea dishes